The following lists events that happened during 1916 in New Zealand.

Incumbents

Regal and viceregal
 Head of State – George V
 Governor – Arthur Foljambe, 2nd Earl of Liverpool

Government
The 19th New Zealand Parliament continued as a grand coalition led by the Reform Party.
Speaker of the House – Frederic Lang (Reform Party)
Prime Minister – William Massey (Reform Party)
Minister of Finance – Joseph Ward

Parliamentary opposition
 Leader of the Opposition – Joseph Ward (Liberal Party). Ward retained the title even though he was part of the coalition government.

Judiciary
 Chief Justice – Sir Robert Stout

Main centre leaders
Mayor of Auckland – James Gunson
Mayor of Wellington – John Luke
Mayor of Christchurch – Henry Holland
Mayor of Dunedin – James Clark

Events 
 January – The New Zealand Expeditionary Force (NZEF) becomes the New Zealand Division.
 April – The New Zealand Division leaves Egypt and travels via Marseilles to northern France.
 12 May – First patrol by the New Zealand Mounted Rifles Brigade in the Sinai desert.
 13 May – New Zealand Division moves into front-line trenches at Armentières.
 7 July – The New Zealand Labour Party is founded in Wellington.
 13 July – Vivian Walsh is the first New Zealander to obtain a pilot's licence while resident in New Zealand.
 15 September – First major action by New Zealand Division in France, at Flers in the Somme. Over the following 23 days, 1560 New Zealanders are killed and 5440 wounded.
 16 September – William Jolliffe is appointed New Zealand's first censor (on his birthday)
 20 September – The Canterbury (NZ) Aviation Company is established in Christchurch. Henry Wigram is the main instigator. The Company's aims are to train pilots for the war, promote local aviation defence and pioneer commercial aviation.
 15 October – The 16th New Zealand national census is taken.
 October – The Canterbury (NZ) Aviation Company purchases land at Sockburn near Christchurch. The first planes will not arrive until the following year.
 16 November – First ballot held for reinforcements for the NZEF.

Arts and literature

See 1916 in art, 1916 in literature, :Category:1916 books

Music

See: 1916 in music

Film
The Mutiny of the Bounty

See: 1916 in film, List of New Zealand feature films, Cinema of New Zealand, :Category:1916 films

Sport

Golf
 The New Zealand Open championship and National Amateur Championships are not held due to the war.

Horse racing

Harness racing
 New Zealand Trotting Cup – Cathedral Chimes
 Auckland Trotting Cup – Admiral Wood

Thoroughbred racing
 New Zealand Cup – Ardenvhor
 Auckland Cup – Depredation
 Wellington Cup – Bee
 New Zealand Derby – The Toff

Lawn bowls
The national outdoor lawn bowls championships are held in Christchurch.
 Men's singles champion – E.H. Fountain (Roslyn Bowling Club)
 Men's pair champions – V. Dimock, Charles Parata (skip) (Thorndon Bowling Club)
 Men's fours champions – C.W. Davis, A. E. Davis, A.B. Duff, J. Laughton (skip) (Newtown Bowling Club)

Rugby union
 The Ranfurly Shield (held by ) is not contested as interprovincial matches are cancelled due to the war.

Soccer
 Provincial league champions:
 Auckland – North Shore
 Canterbury – Christchurch Rangers
 Hawke's Bay – Waipukurau
 Otago – Mornington
 Southland – No competition
 Wanganui – No competition
 Wellington – No competition

Births

January
 4 January
 Stuart Babbage, Anglican priest, civil rights advocate, writer
 John Reid, English literature academic
 7 January – John Brown, cyclist
 11 January – Alan Low, economist
 13 January – Joy Drayton, teacher, academic leader, politician
 15 January – Ron Guthrey, soldier, politician, disabled sports advocate
 25 January – Ernest Duncan, mathematician and professor
 29 January – Esther Blackie, cricketer
 31 January – Jack Finlay, rugby union player and coach, soldier

February
 10 February – Manuhuia Bennett, Anglican bishop
 17 February – Geoffrey Fisken, World War II fighter pilot
 21 February – Mick Connelly, politician

March
 6 March – Te Kari Waaka, Ringatū minister, Tūhoe leader
 8 March – Norman Fisher, boxer
 9 March – Ron Withell, boxer
 19 March – Joan Donley, midwife
 21 March – Max Brown, novelist, journalist
 23 March – Vince McGlone, seaman, television personality

April
 4 April – Selwyn Toogood, radio and television personality
 12 April – Russell Garcia, composer
 14 April – Lawrence Hogben, naval officer, meteorologist
 17 April – Robert Menzies, cricketer
 21 April – Harry Frazer, rugby union player
 25 April – Keith Elliott, soldier

May
 3 May – Keith Bracey, television personality
 5 May – Doris Lusk, artist
 9 May – Bob Whaitiri, Ngāi Tahu leader
 14 May – Joan Dingley, mycologist
 20 May – Clifford Dalton, nuclear scientist
 24 May – Noel McMahon, cricketer

June
 3 June – Lorelle Corbin, naval officer
 11 June – Bob Berry, dendrologist
 14 June – Gordon Bromley, long-distance runner

July
 2 July – Tom Walker, soil scientist, television personality
 9 July – Dean Goffin, composer
 16 July – Bill Carson, cricketer, rugby union player, soldier
 17 July – Sid Scales, cartoonist
 18 July – Owen Woodhouse, jurist
 20 July – Bill Gilbert, soldier, intelligence service director
 21 July – Roy Taylor, cyclist
 31 July – Verdun Scott, cricketer

August
 1 August
 Dorothy Daniels, ballet teacher and director
 Sybil Lupp, mechanic, motor-racing driver
 6 August – Tom Clark, industrialist, yachting patron
 15 August – Derek Freeman, anthropologist
 22 August – Rona McCarthy, athlete
 30 August – Tex Morton, country music entertainer

September
 1 September – Allan McCready, politician
 9 September
 Charles Fleming, scientist
 Jack Scott, politician
 14 September – Edward Norman, soldier, Anglican bishop

October
 10 October – Gordon Cochrane, military and civil pilot
 15 October – Leonard Thornton, military leader
 25 October – Bruce Campbell, lawyer, politician, jurist
 26 October – Ernest Bezzant, cricketer
 28 October – Frank Kerr, cricketer
 30 October – Peter King, army officer

November
 4 November – Allan Pyatt, Anglican bishop
 11 November – Ramai Hayward, photographer, actor, cinematographer
 16 November
 Harold Baigent, actor, theatre director
 Herb Green, obstetrician and gynaecologist
 17 November
 Paraone Reweti, politician
 George Silk, photojournalist
 21 November – Margaret Dalziel, English literature academic

December
 1 December – Alan Boxer, Royal Air Force officer
 12 December – Jack Davies, swimmer
 13 December – Ossie Cleal, association footballer, cricketer
 15 December – Maurice Wilkins, physicist and molecular biologist
 18 December – Noel Crump, swimmer
 19 December – Merv Wallace, cricketer
 26 December – Jean Sandel, surgeon
 27 December
 Betty Forbes, high jumper
 Frank Hofmann, photographer, musician
 28 December – Frederick Turnovsky, manufacturer, arts advocate

Exact date unknown
 Garth Chester, furniture designer

Deaths

January–March
 16 January – Henare Kohere, rugby union player, soldier (born 1880)
 22 January – Lucy Mansel, community worker (born 1831)
 9 March – Edward Moss, politician (born 1856)
 16 March – Thomas King, astronomer (born 1858)

April–June
 4 April – John McIndoe, printer (born 1858)
 7 April – Horace Martineau, soldier (born 1874)
 9 May – William Graham, surveyor, farming leader, politician (born 1841)
 20 May – Fanny Howie, singer and composer (born 1868)
 22 May – Kimball Bent, soldier, adventurer (born 1837)
 23 May – Charlie Douglas, explorer, surveyor (born 1840)
 21 June – William Mowbray, teacher, musician (born 1835)
 8 June – Henry Wilding, social reformer (born 1844) 
 16 June – William Barron, politician (born 1837)

July–September
 4 July – Ann Evans, nurse, midwife (born 1840)
 11 July – Graham Cook, rugby league player (born 1893)
 25 July – Thomas Cooke, soldier (born 1881)
 27 July – Arthur Brown, politician (born 1856)
 28 July – James Escott, politician (born 1872)
 30 July – Eveline Cunnington, social reformer, feminist (born 1849)
 31 July – John Stevens, politician (born 1845)
 24 August – Leonard Williams, Māori language scholar, Anglican bishop (born 1829)
 25 August
 Martin Kennedy, mine owner, politician (born 1839)
 Sir Maurice O'Rorke, politician (born 1830)
 16 September – Rupert Hickmott, cricketer (born 1894)
 17 September – Arthur Martin, surgeon (born 1876)
 19 September – Frank Wilson, rugby union player (born 1885)
 21 September – Bobby Black, rugby union player (born 1893)
 25 September – Stuart Menteath, politician (born 1853)
 29 September – Josiah Martin, educationalist, photographer (born 1843)

October–December
 1 October – Donald Brown, soldier (born 1890)
 12 October – David Gage, rugby union player (born 1868)
 14 October – Jack Carey, trade unionist (born 1876)
 18 October – Samuel Andrews, politician (born 1836)
 19 October – Catherine Francis, teacher (born 1836)
 29 October – John Braithwaite, soldier (born 1885)
 11 November – Frank Isitt, Methodist minister, temperance campaigner (born 1843)
 12 November – Frances Stewart, women's and children's rights activist (born 1840)
 16 December – Coupland Harding, printer, typographer, journalist (born 1849)

See also
History of New Zealand
List of years in New Zealand
Military history of New Zealand
Timeline of New Zealand history
Timeline of New Zealand's links with Antarctica
Timeline of the New Zealand environment

References

External links